Jeffrey Smith Quizon (born January 23, 1973), professionally known as Epy Quizon, is a Filipino actor, television host and the son of comedian Dolphy.

Early life
Born Jeffrey Smith Quizon on January 23, 1973. He is the youngest of 4 siblings. He is the son of late comedian Dolphy and former actress Pamela Ponti.

Filmography

Films

Television
That's Entertainment (1989-1996) Himself/Thursday group member & co-host
Gabi Ni Dolphy (1992)
Purungtong (1992)
Lovingly Yours (1993)
Mikee (1995)
Spotlight Drama Specials (1995)
Mikee Forever (1995)
GMA Love Stories (1996)
Dear Mikee (1998)
Lihim Ng Gabi (1998)
Mula sa Puso (1998)
Campus Romance (1999)
Maalaala Mo Kaya (1999)
GMA Telecine Specials (2000)
Kagat Ng Dilim (2000)
Biglang Sibol, Bayang Impasibol (2001-2002)
Daboy en Da Girl (2002) Emoks
Road Trip (2003) - co-host
Maynila (2005)
Art Jam (2005) - host
Mathinik (2005)
Estyudantipid (Knowledge Channel Philippines, 2005)
Laff To Laff: Ang Kulit (2005)
Quizon Avenue (2005–2006)
Project 11 (2006)
Komiks (2006)
Alpha Omega Girl (2006)
Mga Kuwento ni Lola Basyang (2007)
Ang Walong Bulag (2007)
Sabi Ni Nanay (2007) - guest
Camera Café (2008-2009)
Dyosa (2008–2009) Bakus
Maynila (2009)
Ful Haus (2009) Je
Talentadong Pinoy (2009)
Zorro (2009) Shihong
Full House (2009) Jerry
Pidol's Wonderland (2010)
 Showtime (2010) Guest Judge
 Imortal (2010) young Abraham Villamor
My Driver Sweet Lover (TV series) (2010) Jimrod
Juan dela Cruz (2013) Franco
Kahit Nasaan Ka Man (2013)
Wanspanataym (2013)
Aha! (2013)
The Ryza Mae Show (2014)
Wasak (2014) - guest
Matanglawin (2014)
Boys Ride Out (2014)
Bogart Case Files (2015) - guest
Kapamilya Deal or No Deal Briefcase #13 (2015)
Ipaglaban Mo: Nasaan Ang Konsensya? (2015)
Sabado Badoo (2015)
Nathaniel (2015)
Karelasyon (2015)
FPJ's Ang Probinsyano (2015)
Ang Panday (2016)
Dear Uge (2016)
Magpakailanman (2016)
Pepito Manaloto (2016)
Oh My Mama (2016)
Hay, Bahay! (2016)
A1 Ko Sa 'Yo (2016)
Alyas Robin Hood (2016)
Laff Camera Action! (2016)
Home Sweetie Home (2017)
Tsuperhero (2017)
Minute To Win It (2017)
The Better Half (2017) - Juancho Alejo (antagonist)
Wish Ko Lang (2017)
Super Ma'am (2017) - Jack
Tadhana (2017)
Wildflower (2018) - Stefano
Inday Will Always Love You (2018) - Volta
Hiwaga ng Kambat (2019) - Zandro
Dok Ricky, Pedia (2019) - Martin
The Gift (2019) - Gabriel
Quizon CT (2022) - Himself 
Flower of Evil (2022) - Noel
Running Man Philippines (2022) - guest
Voltes V: Legacy (TBA) - Zuhl
Dirty Linen (2023) - Ador Pavia

Director
Bukal (2021, also as producer)

Assistant director
Langit sa Piling Mo (1997)
Pagdating ng Panahon (1998)
Ms. Kristina Moran: Ang Babaeng Palaban (1999)

Movie producer
Nassan si Francis? (2006)

Movie screenplay
Pagdating ng Panahon (1998)
Ms. Kristina Moran: Ang Babaeng Palaban (1999)

TV writer
Quizon Avenue (2005)

Awards

References

External links
 

1973 births
Living people
Filipino male comedians
Filipino male child actors
Filipino male film actors
Filipino male television actors
Male actors from Manila
That's Entertainment Thursday Group Members
Epy
That's Entertainment (Philippine TV series)
GMA Network personalities
ABS-CBN personalities
TV5 (Philippine TV network) personalities
Filipino people of American descent
Filipino people of Chinese descent
Kapampangan people